Ehrenhausen an der Weinstraße is a municipality with 2,623 residents (as of 1 January 2016) in the Leibnitz District of Styria, Austria.

The municipality, Ehrenhausen an der Weinstraße, was formed as part of the Styria municipal structural reform,
at the end of 2014, by merging the former towns Ehrenhausen, Berghausen, Ratsch an der Weinstraße and Retznei.

The municipality formed with Arnfels, Leutschach an der Weinstraße, Oberhaag and Straß in Steiermark, the tourism agency "Die südsteirische Weinstraße" based in Leutschach an der Weinstraße.

Geography

Municipality arrangement 
The municipality territory includes the following eight sections (populations as of 2015):
 Ehrenhausen (1,101)
 Ewitsch (393)
 Ottenberg (110)
 Ratsch an der Weinstraße (328)
 Retznei (382)
 Unterlupitscheni (28)
 Wielitsch (217)
 Zieregg (16)

The municipality consists of seven Katastralgemeinden (areas 2015):
 Ehrenhausen
 Ewitsch
 Ottenberg (279.38 ha)
 Ratsch (550.59 ha)
 Retznei (153.95 ha)
 Unterlupitscheni (177.08 ha)
 Wielitsch

Demographics

Politics

Mayor 
Martin Wratschko (ÖVP) was elected in the constituent session of the town council on 16 April 2015 as Bürgermeister.
Wratschko was until the end of 2014, the mayor of the former municipality Ehrenhausen.

The municipality also includes: vice-mayor Johannes Zweytick (ÖVP) and town treasurer Detlef Gruber (SPÖ).
Zweytick was, before 1 January 2015, the commissioner at the start of the newly merged municipality.

Municipal council 
The municipal council consists of 15 members. After the results of the 2015 election, the council convened with the following:
 8 Mandate ÖVP
 6 Mandate SPÖ
 1 Mandat FPÖ

The last election brought the following results:

Gallery

References

External links 

 Marktgemeinde Ehrenhausen an der Weinstraße: Offizieller Internetauftritt der Gemeinde, retrieved on 8 June 2014 .

Cities and towns in Leibnitz District